Dana Guth is a German politician from Lower Saxony. Since the 2017 state election, she has been the leader of the Alternative for Germany party group in the Landtag of Lower Saxony. From 2018 to 2020 Guth was chairman of the AfD in the federal state of Lower Saxony.

References

External links 
 Dana Guth on Twitter

1970 births
Living people
21st-century German women politicians
Politicians from Lower Saxony
Alternative for Germany politicians
Members of the Landtag of Lower Saxony
Independent politicians in Germany